is the thirtieth single by the Japanese Pop-rock band Porno Graffitti. It was released on February 10, 2010. The title track was used as the theme song for the Japanese drama Shukumei 1969-2010.

Track listing

References

2010 singles
Porno Graffitti songs
SME Records singles
2010 songs